The term moveable (or movable) feast, and other variants, may refer to:

 Moveable feast, any annual religious observance (Easter is a well-known example) whose calendar date varies from year to year
 Moveable Feast (organization), Baltimore-based HIV/AIDS program
 Titled works:
 A Moveable Feast, memoir of Ernest Hemingway
 Musical works:
 A Moveable Feast, US edition of 1974 album Fairport Live Convention  
 "Moveable Feast" (1978), track by Henry Mancini on soundtrack album Who Is Killing the Great Chefs of Europe?
 A Moveable Feast (2007), album by The Sharp Things
 "Moveable Feast" (2001), (double) episode of the US television program Will & Grace